Guram Gogichashvili is a Georgian rugby union player who plays as a prop for Racing 92.  He was called into the Georgia U20 squad for the 2017 World Rugby Under 20 Championship.

Biography
Gogichashvili began his career in 2016 with Locomotive in the Georgia Championship.

References

1998 births
Living people
Rugby union players from Georgia (country)
Georgia international rugby union players
Rugby union props